Nova Rača is a settlement and municipality in Bjelovar-Bilogora County, Croatia. There are 4,077 inhabitants, of whom 91% are Croats.

References

Municipalities of Croatia
Populated places in Bjelovar-Bilogora County